Federal Office for Labour may refer to:

Germany
Bundesagentur für Arbeit

United States
United States Department of Labor